The Evergreen State College is a public liberal arts college in Olympia, Washington. Founded in 1967, it offers a non-traditional undergraduate curriculum in which students have the option to design their own study towards a degree or follow a pre-determined path of study. Full-time students can enroll in interdisciplinary academic programs, in addition to stand-alone classes. Programs typically offer students the opportunity to study several disciplines in a coordinated manner. Faculty write substantive narrative evaluations of students' work in place of issuing grades.

Evergreen's main campus, which includes its own saltwater beach, spans 1,000 acres of forest close to the southern end of the Puget Sound. Evergreen also has a satellite campus in nearby Tacoma. The school offers a Bachelor of Arts in Liberal Arts and Bachelor of Science, Master of Environmental Studies, Master in Teaching, Master of Public Administration, and Master of Public Administration in Tribal Governance.

Evergreen was one of many alternative colleges and programs launched in the 1960s and 1970s, often described as experiments. While the vast majority of these have either closed or adopted more mainstream approaches, Evergreen is pursuing its mission, although enrollment is declining.

History
In 1964, a report was issued by the Council of Presidents of Washington State baccalaureate institutions stating that another college was needed in the state to balance the geographical distribution of the existing state institutions. This report spurred the 1965 Washington legislature to create the Temporary Advisory Council on Public Higher Education to study the need and possible location for a new state college.

On January 24, 1968, "The Evergreen State College" was selected from 31 choices as the name of the new institution. On November 1, 1968, Charles J. McCann assumed the first presidency of the college. McCann and the founding faculty held the first day of classes October 4, 1971, with 1128 students. McCann served from 1968 until stepping down to join the faculty June 6, 1977, when former Governor Daniel J. Evans, who signed the legislation creating Evergreen, assumed the presidency. Evans left the president's office in 1983 when he was appointed to the United States Senate to fill the vacancy created by the death of Senator Henry M. Jackson. The largest building on campus is named in honor of Evans, the Daniel J. Evans Library Building. The entrance to the campus bears McCann's name, the Charles J. McCann plaza.

In the 1992–93 school year, students chose Leonard Peltier to give the address at commencement, which was the first with a graduating class of more than 1,000. The selection was described as "perhaps the most unconventional commencement speaker" in a published round-up of the most controversial graduation speakers on campuses nationwide that year. Peltier, who was in federal prison, submitted his remarks in writing, to be read by a graduating senior.

In 1999, Mumia Abu-Jamal was invited to deliver the keynote address by audiotape for the graduating class at the college. The event was protested by some.

In 2004, the college completed the  Seminar II building, as well as a significant remodeling of the Daniel J Evans Library.

In 2015, George Sumner Bridges became the sixth president of Evergreen State College, not counting interim appointments. Bridges had previously served as president of Whitman College in Walla Walla, Washington. He followed Thomas L. "Les" Purce (2000–2015), Jane L. Jervis (1992–2000), and Joseph D. Olander (1985–1990).

2017 protests
President Bridges appointed a committee to study social equity on campus. In November 2016, the committee recommended changes to faculty hiring and evaluation criteria that proved to be controversial. The debate continued through the spring quarter. Every April from the 1970s until 2017, Evergreen held a daylong event called "Day of Absence", inspired by the Douglas Turner Ward play of the same name, during which minority students and faculty members voluntarily stayed off campus to raise awareness of the contributions of minorities and to discuss racial and campus issues. Since 1992, the Day of Absence has been followed by the "Day of Presence", when the campus community reunites. In 2017, approximately 25% of Evergreen students were members of racial minority groups.

In 2017, some students of color voiced concerns about feeling unwelcome on campus following the 2016 US presidential election and a 2015 off-campus police shooting. Consequently, "it was decided that on Day of Absence, white students, staff and faculty will be invited to leave the campus for the day's activities" to attend an off-campus event. The off-campus event was held at a church that accommodated 200 people, about 7% of the white student body. An event for students of color was held on the Evergreen campus. Bret Weinstein, a professor of biology at Evergreen, wrote a letter in March to Evergreen faculty, protesting the change in format, stating "On a college campus, one's right to speak—or to be—must never be based on skin color." and "There is a huge difference between a group or coalition deciding to voluntarily absent themselves from a shared space to highlight their vital and under-appreciated roles and a group or coalition encouraging another group to go away." The incident attracted national attention, with The New York Times writing that Evergreen "found itself on the front line of the national discontent over race, speech and political disagreement" and that the national exposure led "right-leaning websites to [heap derision] on their newest college target".

In late May 2017, student protests disrupted the campus and called for a number of changes to the college. Protesters occupied the office of Evergreen’s President George Bridges, without permission; exits to the campus library were blocked with furniture.  Weinstein was told by campus police that it was not safe for him to be on campus, which caused Weinstein to hold his biology class in a public park. Weinstein and his wife, professor Heather Heying, later resigned and each received a $250,000 settlement with the university, after having sued for $3.8 million for failing to "protect its employees from repeated provocative and corrosive verbal and written hostility based on race, as well as threats of physical violence".

A June 1 direct threat to campus safety  led to an evacuation and two-day closure of the campus. According to campus police, protesters with sticks and bats caused approximately $10,000 in damage to the campus and forced closure of the school for an additional day. Two weeks later, a June 15 protest on campus by the far-right group Patriot Prayer led to the campus being closed early. The following day, Evergreen's 2017 commencement ceremony was also moved off-campus because of safety concerns. Through the spring and summer, African American students reported receiving harassing and threatening messages. An African American staff member and faculty member both resigned before the end of the year claiming escalating online attacks against them.

A report from the college suggested protests may adversely affect Evergreen's enrollment, which has been declining over the last decade. In the immediate aftermath enrollments fell, with the November 2018 head count dropping to 3,327 students, down from 3,881 students in 2017. The college's chief enrollment officer cited "questions about our reputation" as making efforts to attract students "more difficult" and the drop forced the college to cut its budget by 10% and increase student fees. Enrollment has since plummeted 41%, to 2,281 students in fall of 2020 and was expected to top at around 2,000 in 2021. In February 2022, the chief enrollment officer reported that total enrollment had fallen to 1,952 students.

Academics

Undergraduate
Evergreen is unique in that undergraduate students select one 16-credit program for the entire quarter rather than multiple courses. Full-time programs will encompass a quarter's worth of work in everything related to that program concentration, by up to three professors. There are no majors; students have the freedom to choose what program to enroll in each quarter for the entire duration of their undergraduate education, and are not required to follow a specific set of programs. Evergreen is on the "quarter" system, with programs lasting one, two, or three quarters. Three-quarter programs are generally September through June.

At the end of the program, the professor writes a one-page report ("Evaluation") about the student's activity in the class rather than awarding a letter grade, and has an end-of-program evaluation conference with each student. The professor also determines how many credits should be awarded to the student, and students can lose credit.

In order to be granted a Bachelor of Science degree, a student must complete 180 credits, 72 of which need to be in science, with 48 of those noted as upper division. This requirement can be satisfied by one year of upper-division science.

Evergreen offers an evening and weekend program.

Graduate
Unlike the undergraduate programs, the graduate programs require a student to take a certain rotation of courses.

Evergreen graduate studies consist of the following three programs:
 Master of Environmental Studies
 Master in Teaching
 Master of Public Administration

Rankings

Among regional schools offering some masters programs but few doctorates in the western United States, U.S. News & World Report in 2020 ranked Evergreen tied for 37th overall, second for "most innovative", tied for fourth best for undergraduate teaching, tied for 14th best public school, and tied at 21st best school for veterans.

The Evergreen State College has an admission rate of 98%.

Facilities

Daniel J. Evans Library
The main library on the Evergreen State College campus is the Daniel J. Evans Library, named after the former governor who signed the legislation that founded Evergreen, and was also the school's second president. The library is home to some 428,000 volumes and 750,000 print and media items overall. The library hosts a number of small viewing rooms and also maintains special collections of rare books, archival material, and government documents. The Quantitative and Symbolic Reasoning Center (QuaSR), a tutoring center for the sciences, is located on the first floor of the library. The library is located in the Information Technology wing of the Daniel J. Evans Library Building. This wing is also the home for Media Services and a large Academic Computing center.

Environmental reserve and beach
The Evergreen State College has  of land that is mostly second growth forest. The entire campus serves as a natural laboratory for scientific field research and provides inspiration for creative work. Throughout the  forest there are multiple trails leading to a variety of locations throughout the reserve and to Evergreen Beach. The coastal habitat is characterized by steep bluffs, gravelly beaches with many washed-up logs, and the marine intertidal zone which extends up to  out into Puget Sound's Eld Inlet during low tides. Students use the beach and tidelands for scientific study and as a place to get away from their studies and relax. There are multiple trails leading to the beach and a small road that leads to the only building at the beach and a small boat ramp. The bluffs range from 15 to 60 feet (5 to 20 m) in height.

Organic farm

The farm also produces apples and other perennial food crops, and tends to a flock of hens. Produce is sold to the Evergreen community through CSA (Community Supported Agriculture) shares, or from a farm-stand on Red Square every Tuesday and Thursday from 11am to 5pm during the growing season. Produce is sometimes sold to campus food services Aramark and the Flaming Eggplant Cafe. Excess produce is available to students in the interdisciplinary program, titled "The Practice of Sustainable Agriculture".

Proceeds from the sale of the crops are used to finance farm projects, as well as purchase seeds and equipment. Two of the greenhouses, the cooler, compost shed, farm fencing and orchard are just a few projects made possible from farm sales. Another use for money generated on the farm is to fund student projects. Many of these projects are related to horticultural aspects of food crops.

The farm production area is divided into sections that are used to delineate cropping areas for specific types of crops. The farm practices a strict five year crop rotation. The rotating of crops creates plant diversity over time as opposed to plant diversity in space. The rotation has four general crop categories with each category occupying a given space for one growing season.

Crop rotation is just one method the farm uses to maintain diversity in the field. Other methods employed are the use of undersown ground covers and inter-cropping different types of vegetable crops. Creating diversity in the field is one of the cornerstones of sustainable agriculture. Diversity provides non-toxic, sustainable crop protection against plant diseases and insect pests.

The Evergreen Organic Farm hosts a large composting facility that composts all compostables from the campus. It also hosts a Biodiesel facility, a community garden, demeters garden, and a large farmhouse that was partially built by students.

Public service centers
The Evergreen State College is the home of the Longhouse Education and Cultural Center. The Longhouse exists to provide service and hospitality to students, the college, and surrounding Native communities. With a design based on the Northwest Indigenous Nations' philosophy of hospitality, its primary functions are to provide a gathering place for hosting cultural ceremonies, classes, conferences, performances, art exhibits and community events. The Longhouse provides the opportunity to build a bridge of understanding between the regions' tribes and visitors of all cultures. The public service mission of the Longhouse is to promote indigenous arts and cultures through education, cultural preservation, and economic development.

It is also the administrative home for the Washington State Institute for Public Policy. The institute's mission is to carry out practical, non-partisan research—at legislative direction—on issues of importance to Washington State. The institute conducts research using its own policy analysts and economists, specialists from universities, and consultants. Institute staff work closely with legislators, legislative and state agency staff, and experts in the field to ensure that studies answer relevant policy questions.

Other notable public service centers on campus are:
 Washington Center for Improving the Quality of Undergraduate Education
 Center for Community-Based Learning and Action

Athletics
The Evergreen State athletic teams are called the Geoducks. The college is a member of the National Association of Intercollegiate Athletics (NAIA), primarily competing in the Cascade Collegiate Conference (CCC) since the 1999–2000 academic year.

Evergreen competes in seven intercollegiate varsity sports: Men's sports include basketball, soccer and track & field; while women's sports include basketball, soccer, track & field and volleyball. Former sports included men's & women's cross country and men's & women's crew.

Mascot
A geoduck is a clam native to the region.

Soccer
Former men's soccer star Joey Gjertsen, who led the Geoducks to the 2004 NAIA National Quarterfinals, has gone on to have professional success with the San Jose Earthquakes of Major League Soccer. Shawn Medved previously had success in the MLS, playing for D.C. United and the San Jose Clash. Medved scored the tying goal in the 1996 MLS Cup as D.C. went on to the championship.

Basketball
Evergreen also had a strong run in men's basketball during the first decade of the 21st century, winning the 2002 CCC Championship and reaching the NAIA National Tournament in 2002, 2009 and 2010. Forward Mike Parker from the '02 team has become one of the top professional players in Japan, and several other basketball players have gone on to professional careers overseas.

Media

Student publications

Student media include student-run newspaper The Cooper Point Journal, and Evergreen's community radio station KAOS-FM.

Evergreen State College Press
The Evergreen State College Press is a university press affiliated with Evergreen State College. Major works released by the press include fieldguides like Writing American Cultures (2013) and Vascular Plants of the South Sound Prairies (2016).

Notable people

Among notable alumni are cartoonists Craig Bartlett, Lynda Barry, Charles Burns, and Matt Groening;, art historian and theorist Douglas Kahn; comedians Josh Blue and Michael Richards; entrepreneurs Paul Stamets and Lynda Weinman; film producer Audrey Marrs; musicians Carrie Brownstein, Martin Courtney, Kimya Dawson, Phil Elverum, Steve Fisk, Kathleen Hanna, Conrad Keely, Macklemore, Lois Maffeo, Myra Melford, Corin Tucker, Tobi Vail, Kathi Wilcox, John Wozniak, and Tay Zonday; Sub Pop founder Bruce Pavitt; Calvin Johnson, founder of K Records; photographer Michael Lavine; politician Yuh-Line Niou; reality television stars John Taylor and Steve Thomas; writers Benjamin Hoff, Judith Moore, Tom Maddox and Wendy C. Ortiz; activist and diarist Rachel Corrie; professional soccer players Shawn Medved and Joey Gjertsen; Washington Lieutenant Governor Denny Heck; Oscar winners Byron Howard and Audrey Marrs; and artists Nikki McClure, Cappy Thompson, and Molly Zuckerman-Hartung.

See also

 Washington State Institute for Public Policy
 History of Olympia, Washington

References

Further reading

External links
 
 Official athletics website

Educational institutions established in 1967
 
History of Olympia, Washington
Cascade Collegiate Conference
Public liberal arts colleges in the United States
Universities and colleges accredited by the Northwest Commission on Colleges and Universities
Universities and colleges in Olympia, Washington
1967 establishments in Washington (state)
Progressive colleges
Public universities and colleges in Washington (state)